Kami Kabange (born 2 July 1984) is a Congolese-born naturalized Rwandan basketball player.

Early life
Born in Likasi, Kabange started playing basketball at a young age, inspired by his brothers. When he was 17, he was noticed by Lubumbashi Sport, who offered him to play in the topflight Congolese league.

Professional career
After playing one season with Lubumbashi Sport, Kabange appeared two seasons for Besa Mazembe.

Kabange started his professional career in Rwanda with APR, under head coach Cliff Owuor. In his first season, he helped the team win consecutive Rwandan National League titles.

After four seasons with APR, he transferred to Espoir and helped the team win the 2012 national title.

In 2013, Kabange signed with the City Oilers club of the NBL Uganda league. In 2021, Kabange was on the REG squad again.

In 2019, he played for ASB Mazembe from Congo in the 2020 BAL Qualifying Tournaments.

Kabange represented Rwanda's national basketball team on many occasions. At the 2013 AfroBasket he played most minutes for his team and was Rwanda's top rebounder and shot blocker.

BAL career statistics

|-
|-
|style="text-align:left;"|2022
|style="text-align:left;"|REG
| 1 || 0 || 1.2 || –|| –|| – || 0.0 || 1.0 || 0.0 || 0.0 || 0.0

References

External links
 2017 Africa Basketball League profile
 2015 AfroBasket profile
 Real GM profile

1984 births
Living people
Rwandan men's basketball players
People from Likasi
Centers (basketball)
Rwandan people of Democratic Republic of the Congo descent
Espoir BBC players
ASB Mazembe players
REG BBC players
City Oilers players
APR B.C. players